Nyakato is an Ward in Ilemela District, Mwanza Region, Tanzania. In 2016 the Tanzania National Bureau of Statistics report there were 27,736 people in the ward, from 82,348 in 2012 when Nyamagana District split.

References

Wards of Mwanza Region
Ilemela District
Constituencies of Tanzania